The 2012 Women's Futsal World Tournament was the third edition of the Women's Futsal World Tournament, the premier world championship for women's national futsal teams. It was held in Oliveira de Azeméis, Portugal, from 3 to 9 December 2012, and matches were played at the Pavilhão Dr. Salvador Machado and Pavilhão Municipal de Oliveira de Azeméis. 

Brazil won its third consecutive world title after defeating the Portuguese hosts in the final by a 3–0 score. As in the two previous editions, Brazil, Portugal, Russia and Spain reached the semifinals.

Venues

Referees
 Francisco Pena Diaz (Spain)
 Jeisson Peñaloza Cruz (Costa Rica)
 Katucia dos Santos (Brazil)
 Manuel Benitez (Venezuela)
 Mário Silva (Portugal)
 Maryam Pourjafarian (Iran)
 Nuno Bogalho (Portugal)
 Oleg Ivanov (Ukraine)
 Raquel Ruano (Spain)
 Sam Sudin Bin Ibrahim (Malaysia)
 Sérgio Magalhães (Portugal)
 Irina Velikanova (Russia)
 Yasukazu Nobumoto (Japan)

Timekeepers
 Marco Rodrigues (Portugal)
 Valter Martins (Portugal)
 Ruben Guerreiro (Portugal)

Group stage

Group A

Group B

Play-off round

Final ranking

References

External links
Reports at LPF.pt
Reports at Futsalplanet
Reports at FutsalGlobal
Reports at Belichanka.com

Women World Tournament
Women's Futsal World Tournament
International futsal competitions hosted by Portugal
Futsal